Laura Woolsey Lord Scales (November 13, 1879 – June 12, 1990) was an American educator and college dean.

Biography
Scales was the daughter of John King Lord (1848–1926), a historian who served as acting president of Dartmouth College in 1892 and 1893; her two brothers became a professor of anatomy and a publisher. She graduated from Smith College in 1901 and in 1908 married Robert Leighton Scales (1880–1912), a lawyer and former English instructor at Dartmouth who coauthored the debate book Argumentation and Debate. In 1913, after Scales' death, she became an instructor at Boston's Museum of Fine Arts, before resigning in 1920 to become dean of women at the Carnegie Institute of Technology. She then returned to Smith, where she served as dean of students for 22 years (1922–1944). In order to create a sense of community spirit, Scales instituted a policy that all students live on the campus.

Scales died in 1990 at the age of 110 years, 211 days, one of the oldest people in the world at the time. The Massachusetts legislature issued a resolution in honor of her 110th birthday in 1989.  Her papers are archived at Smith College.

Awards and honors
Smith gave Scales an honorary doctorate of humane letters in 1931, and Dartmouth College awarded her an honorary doctorate in literature eight years later. In 1936, Smith College named a newly built dormitory the Laura Scales House; notable residents have included Gloria Steinem.

Selected publications

References

External links
 Laura Scales Papers, 1879–1990, Smith College archives
 Laura Scales photographed in the house named in her honor, by Alfred Eisenstaedt for Life magazine

1879 births
1990 deaths
American supercentenarians
Smith College staff
Women supercentenarians
American university and college faculty deans
Smith College alumni
School of the Museum of Fine Arts at Tufts faculty
Carnegie Mellon University people